

Group A

Belize

Costa Rica

El Salvador
Head Coach:  Mauricio Alfaro

Nicaragua

Group B

Guatemala

Honduras
Head coach: Carlos Ramon Tabora

Source:

Panama

References 

2013 Central American Games
2013 in Central American football
2013 men